The 2023 PCS season is the fourth year of the Pacific Championship Series (PCS), a professional esports league for the MOBA PC game League of Legends. The spring split began with the start of the regular season on 3 February and will conclude with the end of playoffs on 9 April.

Spring

Teams and rosters 
Meta Falcon Team was acquired by Taiwanese streamer Chang "Godtone" Chia-hang, who subsequently founded Hell Pigs. SEM9 partnered with Philippine team West Point Esports to form SEM9 WPE. PSG Talon and Impunity Esports moved their teams to Taipei, Taiwan.

Regular season standings 
 Format: Double round robin, best-of-one

Playoffs 
 Format: Double elimination
 Participants: Top six teams from the PCS regular season and top two teams from the LCO playoffs
 Winner qualifies for the 2023 Mid-Season Invitational

Ranking

References 

League of Legends
2023 multiplayer online battle arena tournaments
Pacific Championship Series seasons